Nancy Kemp-Arendt (born 22 May 1969, in Esch-sur-Alzette), née Nancy Arendt, is a politician and former athlete from Luxembourg. She competed in triathlon and swimming. She now sits in the national legislature, the Chamber of Deputies, for the Christian Social People's Party.

Kemp-Arendt competed under her maiden name, Nancy Arendt, at the 1988 Summer Olympics, in Seoul. Participating in the 100m breaststroke and 200m breaststroke, she finished twenty-ninth and thirty-first respectively. After converting to triathlon, Kemp-Arendt competed in that sport's first appearance in the Summer Olympics, in 2000. She took tenth place with a total time of 2:03:14.94. She has won the title of Luxembourgian Sportswoman of the Year a total of six times – two for swimming and four for triathlon – making her the only athlete (male or female) to have won it for success in two different sports.

After her early sporting success, Arendt went into politics, becoming a member for the Christian Social People's Party (CSV) in 1993.  She was appointed to the Chamber of Deputies to fill a vacancy on 23 January 1996, and finished out the term until the legislative election in 1999. In that election, she finished eleventh on the CSV list for the Sud constituency, with seven being elected. However, this was high enough to ensure her replacement of Ady Jung on 3 June 2003, in whose place she served until the following year.  She placed eleventh again in the following election, but on a landslide CSV victory that saw nine CSV members elected from Sud, allowing her to be appointed to fill one of three minister-vacated seats, and has sat in the Chamber since then.

References

External links
 Chamber of Deputies official website biography

Members of the Chamber of Deputies (Luxembourg)
Christian Social People's Party politicians
Luxembourgian female swimmers
Luxembourgian female triathletes
Swimmers at the 1988 Summer Olympics
Triathletes at the 2000 Summer Olympics
Luxembourgian sportsperson-politicians
1969 births
Living people
Sportspeople from Esch-sur-Alzette
Olympic swimmers of Luxembourg
Female breaststroke swimmers
Olympic triathletes of Luxembourg